Yüksel Alkan (1 May 1931 – 23 November 2017) was a Turkish basketball player. He competed in the men's tournament at the 1952 Summer Olympics.

References

1931 births
2017 deaths
Turkish men's basketball players
Olympic basketball players of Turkey
Basketball players at the 1952 Summer Olympics
Place of birth missing